Mount Royal is a federal electoral district in Quebec, Canada, that has been represented in the House of Commons of Canada since 1925. Its population in 2006 was 98,888.

The riding is among the strongest Liberal ridings in the country. Réal Caouette, long-time leader of the Social Credit Party in Quebec, once said that a mailbox could win the Liberal nomination in Mount Royal and still win election just because it was red (the traditional colour of the Liberal Party).  The Liberals have held the riding continuously since 1940, and have only been seriously threatened three times since then—in 1958, 1984 and 2011.

Its best-known MP is former Prime Minister Pierre Trudeau, who represented the riding from 1965 to 1984. Its current MP, Anthony Housefather, was elected on 19 October 2015, garnering 50.3% of the vote, and was profiled as one of 10 rookie MPs to watch in the new parliament.

The riding's English name was eliminated in the 2012 electoral redistribution but was reversed by the Riding Name Change Act, 2014.

The riding has a large Jewish population, the second-largest in Canada at 30.7 percent. It is one of only two ridings in Canada with a Jewish plurality (the other being Thornhill in the Regional Municipality of York in Ontario).

Geography
The district includes the City of Côte Saint-Luc, the Towns of Mount Royal and Hampstead, the neighbourhood of Snowdon and the western part of the neighbourhood of Côte-des-Neiges in the city of Montreal, Quebec.

Demographics

According to the Canada 2011 Census
Ethnic groups: 62.1% White, 10.8% Filipino, 6.3% Black, 5.5% South Asian, 3.4% Arab, 3.3% Southeast Asian, 2.9% Chinese, 2.1% Latino, 1.2% West Asian, 2.4% Other
Languages: 33.0% English, 23.8% French, 5.4% Tagalog, 4.2% Russian, 3.5% Arabic, 2.9% Spanish, 2.4% Chinese, 2.2% Romanian, 1.9% Tamil, 1.8% Vietnamese, 1.7% Hebrew, 1.7% Yiddish, 1.6% Italian, 1.4% Bengali, 1.2% Greek, 1.2% Persian, 10.1% Other
Religions: 44.4% Christian, 30.7% Jewish, 7.4% Muslim, 2.8% Hindu, 2.1% Buddhist, 0.3% Other, 12.3% None
Median income: $24,313 (2010) 
Average income: $48,466 (2010)

According to the Canada 2016 Census
 2016 mother tongue languages (top twenty) : 31.5% English, 25.1% French, 5.8% Tagalog. 3.8% Arabic, 3.8% Russian, 2.8% Spanish, 2.2% Farsi, 2.1% Romanian, 1.8% Vietnamese, 1.8% Mandarin, 1.6% Italian, 1.6% Hebrew, 1.5% Tamil, 1.3% Bengali, 1.2% Greek, 1.1% Yiddish, 0.7% Hungarian, 0.7% Cantonese, 0.6% Portuguese, 0.5% Korean, 0.5% Polish, 0.5% Creole languages

History
The electoral district was created in 1924 from Jacques-Cartier and Westmount—Saint-Henri ridings. The electoral district was actually abolished twice since 1924, in 1966 and in 1987; however, the district to replace it kept the same name and incumbent both times.

This riding remained largely intact during the 2012 electoral redistribution, losing a small (uninhabited) territory to Outremont.

Former boundaries

Members of Parliament

This riding has elected the following Members of Parliament:

Election results

Note: Conservative vote is compared to the total of the Canadian Alliance vote and Progressive Conservative vote in 2000 election.
					

Note: Canadian Alliance vote is compared to the Reform vote in 1997 election.
							

						

					

							

				
Note: Social Credit vote is compared to Ralliement créditiste vote in the 1968 election.
		

						
Note: Ralliement créditiste vote is compared to Social Credit vote in the 1963 election.					
							

						
Note: NDP vote is compared to CCF vote in 1958 election.
				

 								
Note: Progressive Conservative vote is compared to "National Government" vote in 1940 election.
							

						
Note: "National Government" vote is compared to Conservative vote in 1935 election.

See also
 List of Canadian federal electoral districts
 Past Canadian electoral districts

References

Campaign expense data from Elections Canada
Riding history from the Library of Parliament:
1924-1966
1966-1987
1987-present

Notes

Côte Saint-Luc
Mount Royal, Quebec
Hampstead, Quebec
Côte-des-Neiges–Notre-Dame-de-Grâce
Federal electoral districts of Montreal